Pilis Abbey was a Cistercian monastery in the Pilis Hills in the Kingdom of Hungary. It was founded in 1184  by monks who came from Acey Abbey in France at the invitation of  Béla III of Hungary. It was dedicated to the Virgin Mary.

References

Sources

Cistercian monasteries in Hungary